Herbster Community Center is located in the community of Herbster, Wisconsin in the town of Clover, Wisconsin. It was added to the National Register of Historic Places in 1997.

History
The community center was funded by the Works Progress Administration in 1939. Construction was completed the following year. It became a gym and the Clover Town Hall.

References

Government buildings on the National Register of Historic Places in Wisconsin
Gyms in the United States
Works Progress Administration in Wisconsin
Government buildings completed in 1940
National Register of Historic Places in Bayfield County, Wisconsin